Victor Zsasz ( or  or ), also known as Mr. Zsasz or simply Zsasz, is a supervillain appearing in comic books published by DC Comics. The character first appeared in Batman: Shadow of the Bat #1 (June 1992). He is a sadomasochistic and psychopathic serial killer who carves a tally mark onto himself for each of his victims. A recurring adversary of the superhero Batman, Zsasz belongs to the collective of enemies that make up Batman's rogues gallery.

The character has been featured in various forms of non-comics media. Most notably, Danny Jacobs has voiced Zsasz in the Batman: Arkham video game franchise, and he has been portrayed in live-action by Anthony Carrigan in the television series Gotham, Alex Morf in the Arrowverse series Batwoman, Tim Booth in the film Batman Begins (2005), and Chris Messina in the DC Extended Universe film Birds of Prey (2020).

Publication history
Zsasz first appeared in Batman: Shadow of the Bat #1 (June 1992), as part of the "Batman: The Last Arkham" four-part story arc, and his origin story was told in The Batman Chronicles #3 (December 1996); both stories were written by Alan Grant and drawn by Norm Breyfogle. As revealed in the foreword to the trade paperback of "Batman: The Last Arkham", Zsasz's name is derived from that of psychiatrist Thomas Szasz; Grant saw the name while visiting a library.

Fictional character biography

Origin story
In Batman Chronicles #3, told by Zsasz himself, it is learned that Victor Zsasz was the head of his own international company and had amassed a large personal fortune in addition to his family's wealth. At the age of 25, his parents died in a boating accident, sending him into a deep depression. He turned to gambling, losing money in competitions around the world. One night, he ended up in a Gotham City casino known as the Iceberg Lounge, where he gambled everything he owned and ended up losing it all to the Penguin; afterwards he saw that his life was empty, driven by desire, and there was no point to his existence. While Zsasz was attempting to commit suicide by jumping from Gotham Bridge, a homeless man tried to assault him with a knife after Zsasz refused to give him money. Instinctively grabbing the knife, Zsasz saw in the man's eyes that all life is meaningless and that nothing and no one matters. He then proceeded to stab the man to death as a "gift" for saving his life. From then on, he dedicated himself to "liberating" others from their pointless existence (Zsasz often refers to his victims as "zombies"). He usually preys on young women, but has no qualms over whom he murders. He slits his victims' throats and leaves them in lifelike poses, adding a tally mark to himself each time. He has been declared insane and is regularly incarcerated in Arkham Asylum courtesy of Batman, breaking out on occasion to carry on his killing.

Later story arcs
During his debut appearance in Batman: Shadow of the Bats opening story arc, Batman: The Last Arkham, Zsasz bribes a contractor to include a secret passage leading out from his cell during the asylum's reconstruction under its new head, Jeremiah Arkham, who inherited the asylum from his uncle, Amadeus Arkham. Although Zsasz is restrained during the daytime when he is being treated personally by Jeremiah Arkham, he is brought back to his cell at night where he would leave the asylum through the secret passage, unbeknownst to the night guards. After murders fitting his modus operandi begin surfacing, Batman and Commissioner James Gordon fake Batman's insanity to get him inside the asylum and investigate Zsasz. Jeremiah Arkham is exceptionally brutal towards Batman, who had supposedly murdered a police officer; over the course of the "treatment", Zsasz had warped Jeremiah's mind and turned him into a mere henchman. Due to these continuous conversations with Jeremiah Arkham, Zsasz realises Batman is a plant and subsequently murders both the contractor and another inmate at Arkham who knows of Zsasz's ploy. Both Nightwing and Batman catch up to Zsasz when he tries to escape for the final time and put him back in Arkham.

Zsasz later appears in Parts 3 and 4 of the Knightfall saga. In Part 3 of Knightfall, Zsasz takes an all-girls boarding school hostage and holds the students at knifepoint until Batman arrives, briefly leaving to kill two police officers who were sent to arrest him. Though weakened both physically and mentally due to the strain of pushing himself for so long to capture the escaped inmates, Batman fights with Zsasz and tries to ignore the lunatic's mockery. He finally snaps, after Zsasz says that they are really one and the same, and administers a savage beating.Batman #493 In Part 4, Zsasz's appearance is a mere cameo, depicting him being led out of the boarding school by police and Harvey Bullock personally threatening him.

During the No Man's Land storyline, Zsasz is a patient in Dr. Leslie Thompkins' field hospital for a brief while, proving to be eminently deadly even when unconscious and strapped to a stretcher when he manages to open one of the arteries of a field orderly with his fingernails. Once he wakes up, he is confronted by Dr. Thompkins, whose utter selfless charity sharply contrasts with his total emptiness; she briefly gives him pause, but is finally repelled by his profound evil. Zsasz later appears in Detective Comics #796, where he fights Stephanie Brown in her role as Robin. He attempts to slit her throat, but is distracted by her unexpected ferocity and falls back, where he attacks and attempts to kill Batman. However, Stephanie eventually defeats him. Zsasz makes a brief appearance in Infinite Crisis #7. He is part of the Secret Society of Super Villains and is one of the many of their members sent to attack the city of Metropolis. The Society loses.

Zsasz is not seen in any major villainous role again until Detective Comics #815, released in March 2006, entitled "Victims". Before a quarterly psychiatric review, Zsasz kills his guards with metal poles attached to his neck bracket and escapes to kill again. Batman hunts for Zsasz, which proves unsuccessful until Zsasz gains access to a charity event (attended by Bruce Wayne) and stabs Wayne's beloved butler, Alfred Pennyworth, in the stomach. Wayne drives Alfred to the hospital, saving his life. To lure Zsasz to him, Wayne holds a press conference in which he announces that Alfred is still alive. Having already made a scar for Alfred, Zsasz realises that his tally is off by one (Zsasz remarks: "My skin...it's crawling...every inch of it feels...wrong.") During the second part of "Victims" (Detective Comics #816), after a fight with Batman, Zsasz proceeds to the hospital to finish off Alfred. Batman catches him off-guard and knocks him unconscious, thus saving Alfred's life and sending Zsasz back to Arkham. Throughout this appearance, Cliff Chiang's artwork portrays Zsasz with visual elements commonly associated with the skinhead subculture, including work boots resembling Doc Martens, tight jeans, a white tank top, suspenders or "braces" and a close-cropped hairstyle.  Additionally, Chiang's portrayal of Zsasz is more outwardly physically imposing than the gaunt, wiry physique created by Breyfogle and favored by most subsequent artists. No dialogue in the story arc references Zsasz being a skinhead nor does it explain his increased musculature and it is likely these visual elements were the decision of the artist.

Zsasz is later seen again in the Gotham Underground story arc where, in issue #3, he appears in a disguised Batman's cell at Blackgate Prison and attempts to kill him with a knife. He ends up cutting Batman's arm just as he was waking up and the resulting fight ends with Zsasz being knocked unconscious and Batman being rushed to the hospital. A naked, desperate and totally deranged Zsasz appeared in the first issue of Batman: Cacophony (2008), written by film director Kevin Smith, killing a young couple and threatening their children before Batman subdues him. His thoughts move so quickly that there are no spaces between the words. In the issue, Batman says that of all the criminals he fights, he hates Zsasz the most.

In the Battle For The Cowl storyline, Zsasz is recruited by a new Black Mask into a group of villains aiming to take over Gotham. This arrangement is explained further in a continuous story arc through the Streets of Gotham series, with Black Mask hiring Zsasz after he saved the former's life following a confrontation with former employee the Firefly. Black Mask presents Zsasz with a briefcase filled with cash and advises him to finally live out his dream, knowing full well any 'dream' of Zsasz's would culminate in mass murder. Apprehensive at first on how to go about this, he eventually decides to take Black Mask up on his offer, dressing in Armani suits (appearing near exactly the image of Woody Harrelson's character in Natural Born Killers) and purchasing a warehouse as his base of operations. During an investigation into the discovery of several children murdered by Humpty Dumpty, Damian Wayne is 'captured' by a man soliciting runaway kids with the promise of a free meal and a place to stay. Damian discovers the man to be a close associate of Victor Zsasz and that Zsasz has been slowly building a financial empire using runaway children and kidnapped orphans in a 'fight to the death' arena where people bet on the winners. The winning child faces a new contestant, and so on, until the last child left fights Zsasz one-on-one, with the promise of freedom for winning (with it clearly evident none have won thus far). Having seen the horrors that Zsasz has left, as well as a haunting memory of seeing the dead bodies of the children he killed, Damian questions why Bruce or Dick have allowed a man like Zsasz to be left alive, despite their moral code against murder. Damian manages to subdue Victor and attack him viciously with a sword, after which he falls into Gotham Harbor. Not wanting to defy his mentor and late father's beliefs, he promises Dick that the blow was not fatal since he "missed Zsasz's spine", but indicated that his chances of survival were slim.

Zsasz is later seen in captivity in Detective Comics #865, after Black Mask's (Jeremiah Arkham) apprehension, in Arkham Asylum. While no reference is made to Zsasz's injury (nor does he appear to be injured), his presence in Arkham alongside Jeremiah strongly suggests the events of this issue take place subsequent to the injury, meaning he did survive the attack.

The New 52
Zsasz has appeared various times in The New 52 (a 2011 reboot of the DC Comics universe) as an inmate of Arkham, and he is later seen attacking Batgirl in the Narrows, while on Venom. Zsasz next appears in Detective Comics (vol. 2) #18 written by John Layman. He is released from Arkham Asylum by the Joker prior to the events of Death of the Family. Later, he is hired by Ignatius Ogilvy, the Emperor Penguin, to "leave [his] mark on Gotham City"; he is given a knife with the Emperor Penguin's insignia on it. Zsasz is later instructed to put the Man-Bat serum on the knife, as part of the Emperor Penguin's plan to turn the population of Gotham City into Man-Bats through an airborne virus. Zsasz is temporarily transformed into one. During the Forever Evil storyline, Nightwing had just retrieved Victor Zsasz from Chicago and was bringing him back to Arkham Asylum. Victor Zsasz was then abducted by Superwoman and Owlman.

DC Rebirth
In the DC Rebirth reboot, Batman and Duke Thomas investigate a series of murders linked to Zsasz.
Flashbacks to the 2017 story arc The War of Jokes and Riddles reveals that Zsasz sided with the Riddler in a war against the Joker He briefly joins a gang of villains assembled by Killer Moth. In the Watchmen sequel Doomsday Clock, Victor Zsasz was at Arkham Asylum when Rorschach was incarcerated there by Batman.

Powers and abilities
In addition to his wiry-yet-tall physique, Zsasz is extremely agile and flexible, able to go toe-to-toe with even Batman for brief bouts. Though he favors slitting his victims' throats with knives, he has no reservations about tossing blades at opponents if the occasion calls for it, and even carries several spare knives for this purpose. Though he personally dislikes guns, considering them "unreliable", Zsasz is known to occasionally carry firearms to coerce his selected victims. Even barehanded, Zsasz is a formidable opponent; as he is locked away in an enormous steel containment unit for 16 hours a day, he has made a habit of practicing isometrics in the cramped space to strengthen his body.

Zsasz is incredibly intelligent and is described as having "a brilliant criminal mind". He is constantly thinking quickly both while incarcerated and active, and some of his escapes have been a result of his cunning schemes. Zsasz is completely unpredictable, having no qualms about who he kills, when and where. Thus, he is almost impossible to track, even if signs of his modus operandi appear evident, as there is no motive or clue trail to follow. Such unpredictability also renders him a danger to anyone and everyone who may encounter him.

During the Streets of Gotham story arc, it is learned that Zsasz sees the world as bathed in red, and everyone in it as a victim he has murdered. He envisions both friend (Black Mask) and foe (Dick Grayson) as having died at his hand with their throats slashed. During his battle with Damian, Zsasz begins to lose his composure when he begins to see him as a living human being rather than as a dead body.

Other versions
Crimson Mist
In Batman: Crimson Mist, Zsasz is one of the  inmates of Arkham Asylum whom the vampiric Batman slaughters. Batman tears Zsasz's chest open with his talons to mark the scar which will represent Zsasz's own life; he then drinks Zsasz's blood and cuts off his head.

Flashpoint
In the alternate timeline of the Flashpoint event, Victor Zsasz is imprisoned in the military Doom prison. During the prison break, Zsasz is killed by the arsonist Heat Wave.

Batman: Arkham City
In the Batman: Arkham City prequel comic book, Zsasz was briefly mentioned by Hugo Strange as an inmate he intentionally, but anonymously released so that the Tyger forces could recapture him to boost Arkham City's credit as a safe prison. Upon admittance, Zsasz quickly became well known as the "Payphone Killer" in Arkham City, hooking up all the old phone lines with the help of the Broker, tracking and murdering anyone unlucky enough to answer one of his calls after being briefly imprisoned by the Penguin in his museum. He briefly appeared in Two-Face's trial against the Joker as a juror, and also agreed to condemn the Joker to death.

Injustice: Gods Among Us
Zsasz appears in the Injustice: Gods Among Us comic book series, interrupting an argument between Superman and Batman, taunting Superman and asking him if he felt the 'release' from taking a life. Wonder Woman then has Cyborg open Zsasz's cell door, much to Batman's horror and Zsasz's delight, only for the insane killer to be quickly swept away by the Flash to the secure location Superman has created for the Arkham patients. Zsasz later appears in Year Five where he is sent by Superman to interrogate Alfred Pennyworth on the whereabouts of the ever-elusive Batman. Alfred is able to put up a fight before Zsasz kills him, not finding out where Batman is, however, as Alfred was both unaware and unwilling to help. This brings Batman out of hiding and he soon after corners Zsasz, beating him into submission. Zsasz refuses to confirm whether Superman sent him and sadistically reveals where he has placed Alfred's tally mark. Damian Wayne shows up and orders Batman to kill Zsasz, or he will do it instead. Zsasz is put back into prison, but Damian sneaks into his cell and kills Zsasz in revenge. Before dying Zsasz stated that the scar representing Alfred's death was his favorite one.

In the game's sequel Injustice 2, the timeline where he was killed by Damian in Year Five has been retconned, and was instead killed earlier by Damian in Year One, in the same time Damian defects to join Superman's side.

In other media
Television
 Victor Zsasz makes his live-action television debut in the Fox series Gotham, portrayed by Anthony Carrigan. This version regularly serves as a hitman of crime lord Carmine Falcone, and is often accompanied by leather-wearing female contract killers. When Falcone eventually retires and leaves Gotham City, Zsasz's allegiances shift to gangster Oswald Cobblepot. Throughout the series, Zsasz has been hired to carry out hits on members of the Gotham City Police Department (including James Gordon and Commissioner Loeb) and other mobsters (such as Fish Mooney and Butch Gilzean).
 Victor Zsasz makes brief appearances in the Harley Quinn episodes "There's No Place to Go But Down" and "The Runaway Bridesmaid," voiced by Brad Morris. In the former, he is seen as an inmate at Bane's rehabilitation center, the Pit, while in the latter, he is seen as a guest at Poison Ivy and Kite Man's wedding.
 Victor Zsasz appeared in the second season of the live action series Batwoman, portrayed by Alex Morf. This version is a hitman who sells his services to whoever can pay him and has had a previous encounter with Ryan Wilder. After Batwoman's disastrous fight with Zsasz, Ryan goes as herself where she engages in a conversation with Zsasz with a hidden device provided by Luke Fox to hack into Zsasz' cellphone. Luke was able to use the information he obtained to discover that Safiyah Sohail hired him to kill his latest targets. After hearing from Alice about Hamilton Dynamics using a serum that had Mary's Desert Rose-affected blood in it, Safiyah contacts Zsasz to target Mary Hamilton. Before Zsasz can finish off Mary, he is attacked by Batwoman in her new Batsuit, where she manages to defeat him.

Films
 Victor Zsasz briefly appears in the 2005 film Batman Begins, portrayed by Tim Booth. An enforcer of mobster Carmine Falcone, Zsasz is put on trial for multiple murders by Assistant District Attorney Rachel Dawes. He is ultimately sent to Arkham Asylum after being deemed psychologically insane by the hospital's administrator Dr. Jonathan Crane, who secretly works for Falcone. Zsasz later escapes from Arkham during Ra's al Ghul's attack on Gotham City, and proceeds to attack Rachel alongside the other inmates before being subdued by Batman. A promotional website for The Dark Knight reveals that Zsasz is still at large.
 Victor Zsasz makes a small appearance in the direct-to-video animated film Batman: Assault on Arkham, voiced by Christian Lanz. He takes a woman hostage in an alley, where he is surrounded by several police officers before Batman arrives and subdues him.
 Victor Zsasz made his DCEU debut in the film Birds of Prey, portrayed by Chris Messina. This version works for Roman Sionis / Black Mask, and takes it upon himself to keep tabs on his employer's newly-appointed driver, Dinah Lance, eventually figuring out that she has been tipping off the police. He is killed by Helena Bertinelli, as it is revealed that he was one of the hitmen who slaughtered her family.
 Victor Zsasz appears in the animated film Injustice, voiced by Reid Scott.

Video games
Lego Batman
 Victor Zsasz appears in the Nintendo DS version of Lego Batman: The Video Game as an enemy bounty in the "Villain Hunt" minigame.
 Victor Zsasz appears as a mini boss in the Nintendo DS version of Lego Batman 2: DC Super Heroes.

Batman Arkham
Victor Zsasz appears as one of the villains in the Batman: Arkham franchise, voiced by Danny Jacobs.

 In the beginning of Batman: Arkham Asylum, during the initial stages of the Joker's takeover, Zsasz manages to escape confinement and take a guard hostage in Pacification, strapping him to an electric chair. Batman manages to sneak behind Zsasz and render him unconscious. However, Zsasz later manages to get free, killing guards in their break room and in the garden. The Joker found him there and recruited him to torture Dr. Young for the TITAN formula; Batman manages to render Zsasz unconscious again, but Dr. Young's rescue is short-lived as a bomb takes her life shortly after. He is later seen in the Scarecrow's final hallucinations as one of the villains escorting Batman into Arkham, similar to the guards who brought the Joker into Arkham Asylum at the start of the game. Later in the hand-to-hand combat challenge modes, Zsasz appears as an NPC that Batman must fight along with regular thugs. He carries two knives, and must be stunned to attack.
 In the sequel Batman: Arkham City, Batman must track him down and foil his murders in a side mission, with Zsasz calling him on various payphones and instructing Batman to find another phone within a time limit before Victor Zsasz starts killing hostages. He explains his backstory over the course of the mission via phoning the player, including him losing his money gambling against the Penguin (who cheats) in the Iceberg Lounge, eventually revealing he feels his only purpose in life is killing. Batman eventually tracks him down to his hideout by tracking the series of communication towers he uses to bounce his telephone signal and stops him before he kills two hostages. However, Detective Mode—a visual mode that highlights elements of interest on-screen—reveals a body in the water, suggesting a hostage unsuccessfully tried escaping or committed suicide, or Zsasz simply grew tired of waiting and killed him. Batman then puts Zsasz in a cage where he kept his prisoners. It is mentioned by the Penguin that Victor Zsasz has murdered over 100 men, women and children. It is also made apparent that he was captured by the Penguin and put on display at one point, before escaping.
 In Batman: Arkham Knight, Victor Zsasz makes a cameo appearance when Batman reviews Oracle's clocktower footage after she is kidnapped. It is also revealed through a Gotham City story that Zsasz has been active in Gotham and has resumed his killings, with Batman having the option of coming across three of his victims posed under a bridge near Wayne Tower.  Several missions related to Zsasz were originally planned to be included in the game, as dialogue from him still exists in the games files, however he was cut because his missions were too similar to the missions of Professor Pyg, and the developers wanted to use a new villain.

Other games
 Zsasz appears as a boss in Batman: Dark Tomorrow, voiced by Scott Sowers.
 Tim Booth reprises his role as Zsasz in the Batman Begins video game, in his original incarnation, rather than "the hitman" he is described as in the film. He first appears when Flass is attempting to interrogate him for information about Falcone's new 'partner', Batman releasing him from his chain to scare Flass into departing Zsasz's cell so that Batman can question Flass, using Zsasz as a threat. Zsasz later makes a brief appearance during the riots where he attempts to terrify Rachel Dawes, but she takes him out with her taser while Zsasz is distracted by Batman's arrival.
 Zsasz appears as a summonable character in Scribblenauts Unmasked: A DC Comics Adventure.
 Victor Zsasz appears in Batman: The Telltale Series, voiced by Kiff VandenHeuvel. He is an inmate at Arkham Asylum and can interact with Bruce Wayne during the latter's commitment to the mental hospital. As part of a scheme to get the billionaire released, "John Doe" manipulates Zsasz into creating a riot, causing him to lash out at another inmate. Depending on whether Bruce chooses to intervene or use the opportunity to arrange his release, he will either attack the billionaire or kill an orderly. Zsasz is also part of the riot at Arkham Asylum created by Lady Arkham, during which he attacks Batman. He is quickly subdued by the vigilante, though the circumstances change depending on a choice from the previous episode.
 Victor Zsasz briefly appears in the story mode of Injustice 2, voiced by Steve Blum. He is killed by Robin during Superman's siege of Arkham Asylum.

Books
The tie-in book for Batman Begins featuring the development art, and the visual guide to the film, also feature a shot of Booth in costume, referring to Zsasz as a serial killer. In the credits and script for the film, as well as all the books and the graphic novelization, his name is spelled "Zsaz'''". The novelization of Batman Begins'' by Dennis O'Neil refers to him as "Victor Zsasz", as does the video game.

See also
 List of Batman family enemies

References

External links
 Victor Zsasz at DC Comics' official website

Batman characters
Characters created by Norm Breyfogle
Comics characters introduced in 1992
DC Comics film characters
DC Comics television characters
Fictional attempted suicides
Fictional assassins in comics
Fictional business executives
Fictional characters with disfigurements
Fictional gamblers
Fictional knife-fighters
Fictional mass murderers
Fictional nihilists
Fictional serial killers
DC Comics male supervillains
Male film villains
Male characters in television
Male characters in film
Self-harm in fiction
Video game bosses